Snook Independent School District is a public school district based in Snook, Texas, (USA).  The district serves students in eastern Burleson County.

As of 2015 the district has about 50 teachers and over 500 students.

History
The Texas Education Agency had put Snook ISD on probation in 2011, 2013, and 2014 due to academic performance. In 2015 the TEA warned Snook ISD to improve or else its accreditation would be revoked. In October 2015 the TEA announced that the accreditation was revoked, and that closure was scheduled for July 1, 2016.

Schools
Snook ISD has two campuses - 
Snook Secondary School (Grades 6-12)
Snook Elementary School (Grades PK-5)

In 2009, the school district was rated "academically acceptable" by the Texas Education Agency.

References

External links
Snook ISD

School districts in Burleson County, Texas